Moisés Lima Magalhães (born 17 March 1988), simply known as Moisés, is a Brazilian footballer who plays for Chinese club Shandong Taishan as a midfielder.

Career

América Mineiro 
Born in Belo Horizonte, Moisés began his career with his hometown's América Mineiro, and was loaned to a host of clubs before being given his chance to impress at his parent club in the 2009 league season when he made his debut in a state league game on 25 January 2009 against Atlético Mineiro in a 0-0 draw. Within the season he went on to establish himself as vital player that helped win the 2009 Campeonato Brasileiro Série C title and promotion into the second tier. The following seasons he would be loaned to second tier clubs Sport Recife and then Boa Esporte, where he had a personally productive period immediately establishing himself within the team and narrowly missing out on promotion with them.

Portuguesa 
In May 2012, he signed a contract with top tier club Portuguesa. On 6 June 2012, he made his Série A debut, against Coritiba in a 2-0 defeat. Four days later, Moisés scored his first top flight goal, against Atlético-GO in a 2-0 victory. Throughout the season he would be an integral member of the team that helped them avoid relegation, however the following season would see the club relegated despite actually improving upon the previous campaigns results after they were deducted four points for selecting a suspended player.

Rijeka 
On 11 January 2014 Moisés signed with Prva HNL side Rijeka, initially on a loan, but the club decided to activate the clause to buy that summer, and he was signed for the following two seasons. Moisés made his first official appearance for Rijeka in a league game on 16 February 2014 against NK Zadar away from home in a 1-0 defeat. On 7 March 2014 he would score his first goal for the club in a league game against NK Hrvatski Dragovoljac in a 1-0 away victory. He would go on win the 2013–14 Croatian Football Cup against Dinamo Zagreb and 2014 Croatian Football Super Cup.

Palmeiras 
In December of 2015 signed a contract with top tier club Palmeiras, for four seasons. He would make his debut in a state league game on 13 February 2016 against Linense that ended in a 2-1 defeat. He would go on to make his first league appearance on 14 May 2016 against Paranaense in a 4-0 victory. He would go on to establish himself as a vital member within their team and helped win them the 2016 Campeonato Brasileiro Série A title. The following season on 19 February 2017 in a state league game against Linense that was won 4-0 saw Moisés miss six months of the season after he sustained a serious injury to his left knee within the game. On his return he would gradually once more establish himself within the team and in the following season he would once again be a vital member of the team that won the 2018 Campeonato Brasileiro Série A title.

Shandong Taishan 
In July 2019, Moisés signed with top tier Chinese club Shandong Luneng Taishan (later renamed to Shandong Taishan). He made his debut for the club on 3 August 2019 in a league game against Guangzhou Evergrande Taobao that ended in a 3-0 defeat. After the game he would go on to establish himself as a regular within the team and was part of the squad that won the 2020 Chinese FA Cup against Jiangsu Suning F.C. in a 2-0 victory. The following season he would gain his first league title with the club when he was part of the team that won the 2021 Chinese Super League title. The next season he would go on to win another Chinese FA Cup with the 2022 Chinese FA Cup.

Personal life
Moisés' younger brother, Matheus, is also a footballer. A goalkeeper, he too started his career at América Mineiro, but spent most of his career at Portugal's S.C. Braga.

Career statistics

Honours
América Mineiro
Campeonato Brasileiro Série C: 2009
Portuguesa
Campeonato Paulista Série A2: 2013

Rijeka
Croatian Football Cup: 2013–14
Croatian Football Super Cup: 2014

Palmeiras
Campeonato Brasileiro Série A: 2016, 2018

Shandong Taishan 
Chinese Super League: 2021
Chinese FA Cup: 2020, 2021, 2022

Individual
 Bola de Prata: 2016
 Campeonato Brasileiro Série A Team of the Year: 2016

References

External links

Player profile at HNK Rijeka 

1988 births
Living people
Footballers from Belo Horizonte
Brazilian footballers
Association football midfielders
Campeonato Brasileiro Série A players
Campeonato Brasileiro Série B players
Campeonato Brasileiro Série C players
América Futebol Clube (MG) players
Coritiba Foot Ball Club players
Sport Club do Recife players
Associação Portuguesa de Desportos players
Sociedade Esportiva Palmeiras players
Croatian Football League players
HNK Rijeka players
Brazilian expatriate footballers
Brazilian expatriate sportspeople in Croatia
Expatriate footballers in Croatia
Chinese Super League players
Shandong Taishan F.C. players
Expatriate footballers in China
Brazilian expatriate sportspeople in China